KP Khanal (born, 11 January 2000) is a Nepalese social activist. He is also known as "Youngest Nepali Social Activist".

Early life and education
Born in Achham,  Khanal completed his primary education in Achham district. KP did his bachelor's degree in humanities at Texas International College.

Awards and nominations
 National Youth Icon Award (in India) - 2018
 National Youth Lead Award - 2019 
 Youth Icon Award - 2020

References

2000 births
Living people
Nepalese activists
Climate activists
People from Achham District